Royal Little (March 1, 1896 – January 10, 1989) was the founder and chair of Textron, and is considered to be the father of conglomerates.

Little graduated from Noble & Greenough School in 1915 and from Harvard University in 1919, despite having been on academic probation. He soon began working for various textile firms, before founding Special Yarns Corporation in 1923 on $10,000 in borrowed money, whose name he changed to Textron in 1944. Little spent much of his time acquiring other textile firms, and was successful in his efforts. By 1947, the company reported sales of $125 million (equivalent to $ billion in ). 

By the 1950s, realizing that the textile industry was not consistently viable, Little began to acquire firms in other industries, beginning the modern conglomerate. Throughout the decade, Textron acquired assets in pneumatic tools, antennas, plastics, plywood, aluminum, helicopters, chain saws, and leather, among others.

Little retired in 1960, at which time Textron was one of the top 100 companies in the country. Other corporations, following Textron's model, attempted to diversify their holdings in industry. In his retirement, he wrote How to Lose $100,000,000 and Other Valuable Advice in 1979.

Little died at his home in the Bahamas in 1989. At his request, there was no funeral.

Royal Little was the nephew of Arthur Dehon Little, the founder of Boston's Arthur D. Little management consulting firm.

Further reading

References
 http://www.answers.com/topic/royal-little
 http://www.britannica.com/EBchecked/topic/343942/Royal-Little

1896 births
1989 deaths
Harvard University alumni
Noble and Greenough School alumni
People from Wakefield, Massachusetts